In the run up to the Greek legislative election of January 2015, various organisations carry out opinion polling to gauge voting intention in Greece. Results of such polls are displayed in this article.

The date range for these opinion polls are from the previous general election, held on 17 June 2012, to the day the next election was held, on 25 January 2015.

Election polling

Vote
Graphical summary

Poll results
Poll results are listed in the table below in reverse chronological order, showing the most recent first, and using the date the survey's fieldwork was done, as opposed to the date of publication. If such date is unknown, the date of publication is given instead. The highest percentage figure in each polling survey is displayed in bold, and the background shaded in the leading party's colour. In the instance that there is a tie, then no figure is shaded. The lead column on the right shows the percentage-point difference between the two parties with the highest figures. When a specific poll does not show a data figure for a party, the party's cell corresponding to that poll is shown empty. The threshold for a party to elect members is 3%.

Color key:

Seat projections
Opinion polls showing seat projections are displayed in the table below. The highest seat figures in each polling survey have their background shaded in the leading party's colour. In the instance that there is a tie, then no figure is shaded. 151 seats are required for an absolute majority in the Hellenic Parliament. 50 additional seats are awarded as a majority bonus to the single party winning the largest share of the votes.

Voting preferences
Polls shown below show the recording of raw responses for each party as a percentage of total responses before disregarding those who opted to abstain and prior to the adjusting for the likely votes of those who were undecided to obtain an estimate of vote share. The highest percentage figure in each polling survey is displayed in bold, and the background shaded in the leading party's colour. In the instance that there is a tie, then no figure is shaded.

Notes

2015 Greek legislative election
Opinion polling in Greece
Greece